Datuk Amar Haji Awang Tengah bin Ali Hasan (born 2 December 1963) is a Malaysian politician who has served as Deputy Premier of Sarawak since May 2017 and Member of Sarawak State Legislative Assembly (MLA) for Bukit Sari since April 1987. He currently also holds the portfolio of Second Minister for Natural Resources and Urban Development and Minister for International Trade and Investment under the administration of Premier Abang Abdul Rahman Johari Abang Openg. Previously, he had also held other cabinet posts under previous premiers Abdul Taib Mahmud and Adenan Satem. Awang Tengah is a member of the Parti Pesaka Bumiputera Bersatu (PBB), a component party of the ruling Gabungan Parti Sarawak (GPS) coalition.

Career
Awang Tengah previously served as Chairman of the Board of Management at the Sarawak Timber Industry Development Corporation. He also served as the Director of the Sarawak Timber Industry Development Corporation.

He is currently the Deputy Premier Minister of Sarawak to fill the vacancy after former Deputy Chief Minister Abang Johari Tun Openg has been appointed as the Premier of Sarawak, other portfolios he is currently serving are Minister of International Trade & Industry, Industrial Terminal & Entrepreneur Development Sarawak and Second Minister of Urban Development and Natural Resources.

See also
 Cabinet of Sarawak

References

1955 births
Living people
People from Sarawak
Malaysian Muslims
Malaysian politicians